

Introduction
This is a list of chancellors of the University of Dublin, founded in 1592.

Chancellors of the University of Dublin
 1592 – 1598: The 1st Baron Burghley
 1598 – 1601: The 2nd Earl of Essex
 1601 – 1612: The 1st Earl of Salisbury (known as  Viscount Cranborne until 1605)
 1612 – 1633: Dr George Abbot, Archbishop of Canterbury
 1633 – 1645: Dr William Laud, Archbishop of Canterbury
 1645 – 1653: The 1st Marquess of Ormonde (created the 1st Duke of Ormonde in 1661)
 1653 – 1660: Henry Cromwell
 1660 – 1688: The 1st Duke of Ormonde (restored)
 1688 – 1715: The 2nd Duke of Ormonde
 1715 – 1727: H.R.H. George, Prince of Wales
 1727 – 1728: Vacant
 1728 – 1751: H.R.H. Frederick Lewis, Prince of Wales
 1751 – 1765: H.R.H. The Duke of Cumberland
 1765 – 1771: The 4th Duke of Bedford
 1771 – 1805: H.R.H. The Duke of Gloucester and Edinburgh
 1805 – 1851: H.R.H. The Duke of Cumberland and Teviotdale (succeeded as H.M. King Ernest Augustus of Hanover in June 1837)
 1851 – 1862: Lord John George de la Poer Beresford, Archbishop of Armagh
 1862 – 1867: The 3rd Earl of Rosse, President of the Royal Society (UK)
 1867 – 1885: The 1st Baron Cairns (created The 1st Earl Cairns in 1878), Lord High Chancellor of Great Britain, (1868 and 1874–1880)
 1885 – 1908: The 4th Earl of Rosse, vice-president of the Royal Society in 1881 and 1887. President of the Royal Irish Academy from 1896
 1908 – 1927: The 1st Viscount Iveagh (created The 1st Earl of Iveagh in 1919)
 1927 – 1963: The 2nd Earl of Iveagh
 1963 – 1982: Frederick Boland
 1982 – 1984: Professor William Bedell Stanford
 1985 – 1998: Francis O'Reilly
 1998 – 2019: Professor Mary Robinson
 2019 – present: Professor Mary McAleese

Vice-Chancellors and Pro-Chancellors of the University of Dublin

The Chancellor of the University of Dublin is supported by a number of Pro-Chancellors who may act in his/her place. The appointment was formerly known as the Vice-Chancellor; this post was held by one individual who acted as deputy to the Chancellor. In 1964, the Vice-Chancellor was replaced by a group of Pro-Chancellors (up to a maximum of six): the seniority of the Pro-Chancellors is determined by date of election.

Vice-Chancellors

 1: Henry Alvey (1609–1612) (had been Provost, 1601–1609)
 2: The Revd Luke Challoner (1612–1613) (had been Regius Professor of Divinity)
 3: Charles Dunn/Doyne/Ó Duinn JCD (1614–1615) "distinguished legist ... son of the Chief of Hy Regan" MP for Dublin University, 1613
 4: The Most Revd James Ussher (1615–1646), Archbishop of Armagh, 1625-1656 
 5: The Right Revd Henry Jones (1646–1660), Bishop of Clogher
 6: The Right Revd Jeremy Taylor (1660–1667), Bishop of Down and Connor
 7: The Most Revd James Margetson (1667–1678), Archbishop of Armagh
 8: The Right Revd Michael Ward (1678–1681), Bishop of Ossory (1678-1680), Bishop of Derry, (1680-1681)
 9: The Most Revd Anthony Dopping (1682–1697), Bishop of Meath
 10: The Very Revd Edward Smith or Smyth (1697–1698), Dean of St Patrick's Cathedral, Dublin
 11: The Most Revd Richard Tenison (1698–1702), Bishop of Meath
 12: The Right Revd St George Ashe (1702–1713), Bishop of Clogher
 13: The Most Revd John Vesey (1713–1714), Archbishop of Tuam
 14: The Right Revd Thomas Smyth (1714–1721), Bishop of Limerick
 15: The Right Revd John Sterne (1721–1743), Bishop of Clogher
 19. Richard Robinson, 1st Baron Rokeby (1765-1791), Archbishop of Armagh
 20. John FitzGibbon, 1st Earl of Clare (1791-1802), Lord Chancellor of Ireland, (1791-1802)
 21. Arthur Wolfe, 1st Viscount Kilwarden (1802-1803), Lord Chief Justice of the King's Bench in Ireland (1798-1803) 
 22. John Freeman-Mitford, 1st Baron Redesdale (1803-1806), Lord Chancellor of Ireland, (1802-1806)
 23. William Downes (1806-1816), Lord Chief Justice of the King's Bench in Ireland, (1803–1822)
 24. Thomas Manners-Sutton, 1st Baron Manners (1816-1829), Lord Chancellor of Ireland, (1807-1827)
 25. The Most Revd Lord John George De La Poer Beresford (1829-1851), Archbishop of Armagh
 26. Francis Blackburne (1852-1867), Lord Chancellor of Ireland, (1852 and 1866–67)
 27. Sir Joseph Napier (1867-1880), MP for Dublin University, (1848–1858), Lord Chancellor of Ireland, (1858-1859)
 28. John Thomas Ball (1880-1895), MP for Dublin University, (1868–1875), Lord Chancellor of Ireland, (1875-1880)
 29. Dodgson Hamilton Madden (1895-1919), MP for Dublin University, (1887-1892)
 30: John Henry Bernard (1919-1919), Archbishop of Dublin (1915-1919), Provost (1919-1927)
 31: Sir James Henry Mussen Campbell, first Lord Glenavy (1919-1931), Lord Chancellor of Ireland, (1918-1921)
 32: Sir Thomas Francis Molony (1931-1949), Lord Chief Justice of Ireland, (1918-1924)
 33: Michael Parsons, 6th Earl of Rosse (1949–1979); Vice-Chancellor to 1964

Pro-Chancellors
 33: Michael Parsons, 6th Earl of Rosse (1949–1979); Pro-Chancellor from 1964
 34: Bryan Guinness, 2nd Baron Moyne (1965–1977)
 35: Professor George Alexander Duncan (1965–1972)
 45: Anthony Joseph Francis O’Reilly (1994–2011)
 46: Susan Jane Gageby Denham (1995–2010)
 47: Professor Eda Sagarra (1999–2008)
 48: Patrick James Anthony Molloy (2000–2013)
 49: Professor Dermot F. McAleese (2005–2017)
 50: Professor Vincent John Scattergood (2008–2015)
 51: Professor Thomas David Spearman (2009–2012)
 52: Petros Serghiou Florides (2010–2012)
 53: Mary Henry (2012–2015)
 54: Edward McParland (2013–2018)
 55: Dame Jocelyn Bell Burnell (2013–2018)
 56: The Honorable Sir Donnell Deeny (2014–present) 
 57: Professor Jane Grimson (2016–present)
 58: Professor David McConnell (2016–2019)
 59: Dr Sean Barrett (2018–2019)
 60: Professor Sheila Greene (2018–2021)
 61: Dr Stanley Quek (2019–present)

Current
 2014 – present: The Honorable Sir Donnell Deeny
 2016 – present: Professor Jane Grimson
 2019 – present: Dr Stanley Quek
 2020 – present: Professor Shane Allwright 
 2020 – present: Professor Ignatius McGovern
 2022 – present: The Honourable Frank Clarke

References

Chancellors
University of Dublin